Nganjuk Regency is a regency (kabupaten) of East Java Province, Indonesia. It bordered Bojonegoro Regency in the north, Jombang Regency in the east, Kediri Regency in the south, and Madiun Regency in the west. It covers an area of 1,224.33 sq. km, and had a population of 1,017,030 at the 2010 Census and 1,103,902 at the 2020 Census. The administrative centre of the regency is the town of Nganjuk. The current regent is Novi Rahman Hidayat.

Administrative districts 
The Regency is divided into twenty districts (kecamatan), tabulated below with their areas and their population totals from the 2010 Census and the 2020 Census. The table also includes the location of the district headquarters and the number of administrative villages (rural desa and urban kelurahan) in each district.

Climate
Nganjuk has a tropical savanna climate (Aw) with moderate to little rainfall from May to October and heavy rainfall from November to April. The following climate data is for the city of Nganjuk.

Notable people
 Shendy Puspa Irawati, badminton player
 Harmoko, Former chairman of People's Representative Council in the Era of President Soeharto
 Erni Suyanti Musabine, veterinarian involved in the conservation of Sumatran tigers

References